The Higgins Family is a 1938 American comedy film directed by Gus Meins and written by Paul Gerard Smith and Jack Townley. The film stars James Gleason, Lucile Gleason, Russell Gleason, Lynne Roberts, Harry Davenport and William Bakewell. The film was released on August 29, 1938, by Republic Pictures.

Plot

Cast 
James Gleason as Joe Higgins
Lucile Gleason as Lillian Higgins
Russell Gleason as Sidney Higgins
Lynne Roberts as Marian Higgins 
Harry Davenport as Grandpa William Jordan
William Bakewell as Eddie Davis
Paul Harvey as Ollie Thornwald
Wallis Clark as George W. Bradshaw
Sally Payne as Lizzie
Richard Tucker as Burgess
Doreen McKay as Miss Keene
Franklin Parker as Reynard
Gay Seabrook as Lydia Amesworth

References

External links
 

1938 films
American comedy films
1938 comedy films
Republic Pictures films
Films directed by Gus Meins
American black-and-white films
Films with screenplays by Jack Townley
Films produced by Sol C. Siegel
1930s English-language films
1930s American films